Berkowicz is a Polish surname. There is a Polish noble family under this surname, of Nieczuja coat of arms. Alternative spelling: Berkowitz, Berkovitz, Berkowits, Berkovits, Berkovich, Bercowitz, Berkovic.

Berkowicz 
 Józef Berkowicz (1789–1846) was a Polish military officer
 Konrad Berkowicz (born 1984), Polish politician

Berkowitz 
 Albert Berkowitz (1910–2008), New York politician
 Avi Berkowitz (born 1988), American attorney
 Benzion Judah Berkowitz (1803–1879), Hebrew scholar
 Bob Berkowitz, American journalist, talk show host, and author
 Bobbie Berkowitz, American professor of nursing
 Bruce D. Berkowitz (born 1956), American author
 Bruce R. Berkowitz (born 1961), American equity fund manager
 Daisy Berkowitz, the stage name of Scott Putesky (1968–2017), American musician
 David Berkowitz (disambiguation), several people
 Edward Berkowitz, American history professor
 Ethan Berkowitz (born 1962), American politician in Alaska
 Gary Berkowitz, American radio frontier
 Ira Berkowitz (born 1939), American writer of crime fiction
 Isaac Dov Berkowitz (1885–1967), Belarus-born Israeli author
 Joan Berkowitz (born 1931), American chemist
 Leon Berkowitz (1911–1987), American painter
 Leonard Berkowitz, an American social psychologist
 Liane Berkowitz (1923–1943), member of the German resistance movement during World War II
 Lisa Berkowitz, American bridge player
 Marc Summers (born Berkowitz; born 1951), American television personality
 Michael Berkowitz, American historian
 Monroe Berkowitz (1919–2009), American economics professor
 Niv Berkowitz (born 1986), Israeli basketball player
 Norbert Berkowitz (1924–2001), Canadian scientist
 Peter Berkowitz (born 1959), American political scientist
 Ralph Berkowitz (1910–2011), American composer, classical musician
 Richard Berkowitz (born 1955), American author and safe sex advocate
 Roger Berkowitz, American seafood restaurant chain owner
 Ron Berkowitz, American entrepreneur, publicist and sports journalist, founder of the company Berk Communications
 Sean M. Berkowitz (born 1967), American lawyer
 Sol Berkowitz (1922–2006), American composer and music educator
 Steven Berkowitz (born 1958), American entrepreneur, CEO of the real estate company Move (2009–2015)
 Terry Berkowitz, American artist
 Tzvi Berkowitz, American Orthodox rabbi

Berkovitz 
 Dan Berkovitz, Commissioner of the Commodity Futures Trading Commission
 Eyal Berkovitz (born 1972), Israeli footballer 
 Jay R. Berkovitz, Professor of Judaic and Near Eastern Studies at the University of Massachusetts Amherst
 Philip B. is the professional name of Philip Berkovitz, an American hair stylist and entrepreneur

Berkowits/ Berkovits 
 Laszlo Berkowits (1928–2020), American rabbi
 Eliezer Berkovits (1908–1992), rabbi, author, theologian and philosopher
 Yitzchak Berkovits, American-Israeli Orthodox Jewish rabbi, rosh kollel and posek

Related names with alternative spelling 
 John Bercow (born 1963), (formerly Bercowitz), British politician
 Miki Berkovich (born 1954), Israeli basketball player

Other 
Berkowitz may also refer to:
25657 Berkowitz, an asteroid

Polish-language surnames
Yiddish-language surnames

he:ברקוביץ'
pl:Berkowicz